Lukou District, formerly Zhuzhou County, is a district of the city of Zhuzhou, Hunan Province, China. Located on the south central Hunan along the Xiang River, the district is bordered to the north by Liuyang City, Lusong and Tianyuan Districts, to the west by Xiangtan County, to the southwest by Hengdong County, to the southeast by You County, to the east by Liling City. The district has 8 towns under its jurisdiction, the seat is at Lukou Town.

Administrative divisions
In the present, Lukou District has 8 towns.
 Gantian
 Guyuefeng
 Longchuan
 Longmen
 Longtan
 Lukou
 Nanzhou
 Zhuting

References

External links
www.xzqh.org 

County-level divisions of Hunan
Zhuzhou